Leela Gandhi (born 1966) is an Indian-born literary and cultural theorist who is noted for her work in postcolonial theory. She is currently the John Hawkes Professor of Humanities and English and director of the Pembroke Center for Teaching and Research on Women at Brown University.

Gandhi previously taught at the University of Chicago, La Trobe University, and the University of Delhi. She is a founding co-editor of the academic journal Postcolonial Studies, and she serves on the editorial board of the electronic journal Postcolonial Text. She is a Senior Fellow of the School of Criticism and Theory at Cornell University.

Early life and education 
Gandhi was born in Mumbai and is the daughter of the late Indian philosopher Ramchandra Gandhi and the great-granddaughter of the Indian Independence movement leader Mahatma Gandhi. She has offered analysis that some of Mahatma Gandhi's philosophies (on nonviolence and vegetarianism, for example) and policies were influenced by transnational as well as indigenous sources. She received her undergraduate degree from Hindu College, Delhi and her doctorate was from Balliol College, Oxford.

She is also the great-granddaughter of C. Rajagopalachari. Her paternal grandfather Devdas Gandhi was the youngest son of Mahatma Gandhi and her paternal grandmother Lakshmi was the daughter of C. Rajagopalachari.

Reviews and critiques 
With the publication of her first book Postcolonial Theory: A Critical Introduction in 1998, Gandhi was described as mapping "the field in terms of its wider philosophical and intellectual context, drawing important connections between postcolonial theory and poststructuralism, postmodernism, Marxism and feminism."

Her next book, Affective Communities, was written to "[reveal] for the first time how those associated with marginalized lifestyles, subcultures, and traditions—including homosexuality, vegetarianism, animal rights, spiritualism, and aestheticism—united against imperialism and forged strong bonds with colonized subjects and cultures". Gandhi traces the social networks of activists in the late nineteenth and early twentieth centuries connecting Edward Carpenter with M.K. Gandhi and Mirra Alfassa with Sri Aurobindo.

Through this work, Gandhi became noted for proposing a "conceptual model of postcolonial engagement" surrounding ethical premises of hospitality and "xenophilia", and for bringing for the first time a queer perspective to postcolonial theory.

Gandhi's third book, The Common Cause, presents a transnational history of democracy in the first half of the twentieth century through the lens of ethics in the broad sense of disciplined self-fashioning. This book has been described as "an alternate history of democracy foregrounding events of errant relation," and "the most thoroughgoing defence of the value of infinite inclusivity to postcolonial studies."

Leela Gandhi is also a published poet. Her first collection of poems, Measures of Home, was published by Ravi Dayal in 2000, and her subsequent poetry is included in several anthologies.

Published books

References 

1966 births
Indian women academics
University of Chicago faculty
Postcolonial theorists
Hindu College, Delhi alumni
Alumni of Balliol College, Oxford
Scientists from Mumbai
Living people
Leela
Women scientists from Maharashtra
Writers from Mumbai
Women writers from Maharashtra
20th-century Indian women writers
20th-century Indian writers
21st-century Indian women writers
21st-century Indian writers
20th-century Indian women scientists
21st-century Indian women scientists
20th-century Indian historians
21st-century Indian historians
Indian women historians
20th-century Indian social scientists
21st-century Indian social scientists
Indian women social scientists
Indian social sciences writers
Women educators from Maharashtra
Educators from Maharashtra
Brown University faculty